Seth Landau is an actor/writer/director and former newspaper reporter for The Arizona Republic and New Times. Landau is known for two independent films, Take Out and "A.P.U.: Art, Pot and Underwear".  The latter was termed by Film Threat as "a look at Hollywood you're not likely to find anywhere else".  The former, "Take Out", was the target of a locally publicized dispute regarding Sean Baker and Shih-Ching Tsou's film of the same name. Landau also directed the 2008 horror film Bryan Loves You.

References

     Story on "Take Out" by Brown University Press
Seth Landau story in Queens (NY) Tribune
Film Threat review of "A.P.U.: Art, Pot and Underwear"

Year of birth missing (living people)
Living people
American male film actors
American newspaper journalists